Château Bellegarde is a château in Rion-des-Landes, Landes, Nouvelle-Aquitaine, France. It dates to the 14th century.

Notes

Houses completed in the 14th century
Châteaux in Landes (department)